Markus Reiterberger (born 9 March 1994) is a German motorcycle racer.

Career
In 2007 and 2008 he was a contestant of the Red Bull MotoGP Rookies Cup; in 2010 he was champion in the German Yamaha Cup and in 2013, 2015 and 2017 he won the IDM Superbike Championship. In 2016 he was a regular rider of the Althea BMW Racing Team in the Superbike World Championship aboard a BMW S 1000 RR.

Reiterberger won the European Superstock 1000 Championship in 2018 aboard a BMW S 1000 RR. He returned to World Superbike in 2019 to again race a BMW S 1000 RR, this time for Shaun Muir Racing and with 2013 WSBK champion Tom Sykes as his teammate.

In 2020, Reiterberger competes in the Asia Road Racing Championship with Team Onexox TKKR SAG BMW.

Career statistics

Grand Prix motorcycle racing

Races by year
(key) (Races in bold indicate pole position, races in italics indicate fastest lap)

Superbike World Championship

Races by year

(key) (Races in bold indicate pole position; races in italics indicate fastest lap)

Asia Road Racing Championship

Races by year
(key) (Races in bold indicate pole position, races in italics indicate fastest lap)

References

External links

1994 births
Living people
Superbike World Championship riders
German motorcycle racers
Moto2 World Championship riders
FIM Superstock 1000 Cup riders